Harwell Creek is a stream in Butler County in the U.S. state of Missouri.

Harwell Creek was named after Edwin Harwell, the grandfather of an early settler.

See also
List of rivers of Missouri

References

Rivers of Butler County, Missouri
Rivers of Missouri